Pierre Isabelle is Principal Scientist and Group Leader of the Interactive Language Technologies group at the National Research Council Canada (NRC-CNRC).

Isabelle holds a Ph.D. in Computational Linguistics. He started his research career in 1975 as a member of the TAUM machine translation group at the Université de Montréal. Between 1985 and 1996, he was in charge of the machine-aided translation team of CITI, a research laboratory of the Canadian Department of Industry. In 1997 he returned to the Université de Montréal as head of the RALI (Recherche appliquée en linguistique informatique) laboratory of the computer science department.  In 1999 he joined the Xerox Research Centre Europe (XRCE) in Grenoble, France, where he managed the Content Analysis area until he joined the NRC in 2005.

He is known for his position on bitexts, and is widely quoted for saying that existing translations contain more solutions to more translation problems than any other available resource.

Sources
 www.chin.gc.ca, CHIN, 2003

Living people
20th-century Canadian scientists
Scientists from Quebec
21st-century Canadian scientists
Academic staff of the Université de Montréal
Canadian computer scientists
Year of birth missing (living people)